Bárbara Elorrieta (Madrid, 5 May 1985) is a Spanish actress and TV producer. Both her grandfather José María Elorrieta and father Javier Elorrieta are film directors.

Filmography
 2006 Rojo intenso
 2004 Rottweiler
 2003 Teresa Teresa
 2003 Pacto de brujas
 2003 Beyond Re-Animator
 2002 Welcome 2 Ibiza

Short films 
 2002 La Araña negra
 2002 Tiempos mejores
 2000 La muerte de Sardanápalo
 2000 Enrique y Ana
 2000 El Cinéfilo
 1999 La Cartera
 1999 Drama
 1999 El apagón
 1999 Es fácil
 1999 Un beso de mentira

Television

As a producer
Intereconomía TV (2008–2009)

As an actress
 2005/06 Negocis de família
 2004 Diez en Ibiza
 2002-2003 20 tantos
 2002 Cuéntame cómo pasó
 2000-2003 en Paraíso
 1998 La casa de los líos

References

External links
 
 www.nosolocine.es
 www.evasanagustin.com

1978 births
Living people
Actresses from Madrid
Spanish television producers
Women television producers